Utica Zoo is a regional zoo in Utica, New York, situated in a section of Roscoe Conkling Park. It consists of a mixture of outdoor and indoor animal enclosures, a petting zoo, nature trails, and other amenities.

The Utica Zoo is primarily funded by the Oneida County government, the New York State Natural Heritage Program, and fundraising by the zoo and private donors. The City of Utica does not financially support the zoo at present, although it still owns the land occupied by the zoo.

History
The Utica Zoo was founded in 1914 with an initial collection of three fallow deer. The first permanent building was erected in 1920. The City of Utica Parks Department managed the zoo until 1964, when responsibility was transferred to a dedicated organization, currently known as the Utica Zoological Society. This organization was later chartered by the State of New York as an educational institution. The first professional zoo director was hired in 1966.

In 2000, a  metal sculpture of a watering can, originally built using city funds by request of Mayor Ed Hanna, was obtained by the zoo. This sculpture is listed by Guinness World Records as the world's largest watering can.

In 2004, amid financial issues, the zoo was forced to defer maintenance on its facilities, and consequently lost accreditation from the Association of Zoos and Aquariums. The zoo began pursuing re-accreditation in 2011 after paying off its debts. The white-handed gibbon exhibit was noted as particularly outdated. Between 2015 and 2018, the zoo held fundraising campaigns to rehabilitate the primate building, and received grants from the state and county. After several years of planning and restructuring, the Utica Zoo was re-accredited by AZA in 2018. Later in 2018, the first outdoor portion of the primate exhibit was finished.

In 2011, the zoo took in African lions named Bakari and Monni. Prior to their arrival, it had been 30 years since the zoo had lions. The two gave birth to three cubs, and were rehomed once the cubs reached maturity:  the cubs still live at the Utica Zoo. In 2019, the zoo's white peacock Merlin was killed by a lion after it flew into their enclosure.

The zoo's red panda couple gave birth to cubs in 2015, as part of the Species Survival Plan for the endangered red pandas. In 2021, both parents died, one of a lung infection and one of a gastrointestinal impaction.

In 2020, the Utica Zoo acquired the Beaversprite nature sanctuary in Fulton County, New York.

In 2021 the zoo rehomed its California sea lions after determining the exhibit was too small for them to exercise freely.

In October of 2022 zoo employees voted to unionize, and are now represented by the Civil Service Employees Association.

Conservation
The Utica Zoo has participated in in situ conservation and research projects for nearby populations of frosted elfins, Chittenango ovate amber snails, and turtles. As part of ex situ conservation and Species Survival Plans it has housed:

 Bennett's wallaby
 North American porcupine
 California sea lion
 African crested porcupine
 white-naped crane 
 Chinese alligator 
 white-handed gibbon 
 Mexican spider monkey
 golden lion tamarin
 golden-headed lion tamarin
 red panda 
 kinkajou
 ring-tailed lemur
 serval
 Canada lynx
 Hartmann's mountain zebra
 Mexican wolf 
 prehensile-tailed skink 
 cotton-top tamarins
 African lion
 collared peccary
 snowy owl

Exhibits
The Utica Zoo's current collection includes:

 Three-toed box turtle
 African bullfrog
 African crested porcupines
 African hedgehog
 African lions
 African milipede
 Alpacas
 American bald eagles
 Arctic fox
 Argentine black and white tegu
 Bactrian camels
 Ball pythons
 Barn owls
 Bearded dragons
 Bennett's wallaby
 Black-crowned night heron
 Black swan
 Hyacinth macaw
 Blue-tongued skink
 Brazilian flying cockroaches
 Burmese pythons
 California sea lions
 Canadian lynx
 Carpet python
 Chickens
 Chilean rose-haired tarantula
 Chinchillas
 Chinese alligators
 Corn snake
 Cotton-top tamarin
 Degu
 Eastern box turtles
 Emu
 European glass lizard
 Ferrets
 Flemish Giant rabbits
 Gray-banded kingsnake
 Giant spiny stick insect
 Hartmann's mountain zebra
 Henkel's leaf tailed gecko
 Hermit crab
 Hissing cockroaches
 Indian peafowl
 Indian Runner duck
 Jacob sheep
 Kenyan sand boa
 Kinkajou
 Leopard gecko
 Leopard tortoise
 Merlin
 Mexican beaded lizards
 Mexican gray wolves
 Mexican spider monkeys
 Milk snake
 Nigerian Dwarf goats
 North American beavers
 North American porcupine
 Virginia opossum
 Ostriches
 Patagonian cavy
 Pine snake
 Prehensile-tailed skink
 Rabbits
 Rainbow boa
 Red-eared slider
 Red fox
 Red-tailed hawk
 Reeves's muntjac
 Ring-tailed lemurs
 Rhinoceros iguanas
 Salmon-crested cockatoo
 Soft shelled turtle
 Spotted turtle
 Snapping turtle
 Star tortoise
 Striped hyenas
 Sulcata tortoises
 Sumatra chicken
 Trans-Caspian urial
 Uromastyx
 Vietnamese pot bellied pig
 Western hognose snake
 White-handed gibbon
 White-naped crane
 Whip scorpion
 Wood turtle
 Zebu

References

External links
 

Utica, New York
Zoos in New York (state)
1914 establishments in New York (state)
Zoos established in 1914